Konohanasakuya-hime is the goddess of Mount Fuji and all volcanoes in Japanese mythology; she is also the blossom-princess and symbol of delicate earthly life. She is often considered an avatar of Japanese life, especially since her symbol is the sakura (cherry blossom).

Shinto shrines have been built on Mount Fuji for Sakuya-hime, collectively known as the Asama or Sengen Shrines. It is believed that she will keep Mount Fuji from erupting, but shrines to her at Kirishima have been repeatedly destroyed by volcanic eruptions. She is also known for having torn up the Yatsugatake Mountains, because it was higher than Fujiyama.

Name and etymology 
Konohanasakuya-hime or Konohananosakuya-hime (木花咲耶姫 or 木花開耶姫; lit. "[cherry] tree blossom blooming princess" (princess, or lady of high birth explains hime; her name also appears in a shorter form as "Sakuya-hime", and she is also called Sengen))

Myths

Ninigi and Sakuya-hime 
Sakuya-hime met Ninigi on the seashore and they fell in love; Ninigi asked Ohoyamatsumi, the father of Sakuya-hime for her hand in marriage. Oho-Yama proposed his older daughter, Iwa-Naga-hime, instead, but Ninigi had his heart set on Sakuya-hime. Oho-Yama reluctantly agreed and Ninigi and Ko-no-hana married. Because Ninigi refused Iwa-Naga, the rock-princess, human lives are said to be short and fleeting, like the sakura blossoms, instead of enduring and long lasting, like stones.

Sakuya-hime became pregnant in just one night, causing suspicion in Ninigi. He wondered if this was the child of another kami. Sakuya-hime was enraged at Ninigi's accusation and entered a doorless hut, which she then set fire to, declaring that the child would not be hurt if it were truly the offspring of Ninigi. Inside the hut, Ko-no-hana had three sons, Hoderi, Hosuseri and Hoori.

Yosoji's Camellia Tree 

According to legend around the 11th century, a small village in Suruga Province named Kamiide was struck by smallpox epidemic. In the village there lived a young boy named Yosoji and his mother who was infected by the disease. To cure his mother Yosoji went to a fortune teller. The fortune teller told him to give his mother water from a small stream near Mount Fuji.

The next day Yosoji decided to go to the river but then stumbled upon three paths. Not knowing which one to take, a young girl in white came towards Yosoji from the forest and guided him to the stream. Yosoji scooped up water from the stream and gave it to his mother to drink.

Days later Yosoji went back to the section where the three paths meet where he saw the girl in white again. She told him to come back in three days, she will meet him. And it will take five trips to treat the villagers.

Five trips later Yosoji’s mother was healed and so were many other villagers. The villagers thanked him, but he knew that he owned it all to the girl in white. So he went back to the stream to give thanks to the women in white. However, he found that the stream was completely dried up and the girl was nowhere to be seen so Yosoji prayed that the girl would reveal herself, and thank her for her actions.

The girl appeared before him and Yosoji said that he wished to tell her how deeply grateful he was to her and he wished to know who she was so he could tell the villagers who to thank. The woman in white said who she was is not important and said farewell to Yosoji. She then swung a branch of camellia over her head and a cloud from Mount Fuji came down and picked her up. That is when Yosoji realized the woman was none other than the Goddess of Mount Fuji.

Genealogy

In Popular culture
In Persona 4 "Konohana Sakuya" is a persona owned by Yukiko Amagi

References

External links 

  - Official homepage of the Asama shrines near Mount Fuji

Japanese goddesses
Nature goddesses
Shinto kami
Mountain goddesses
Mount Fuji
Volcano goddesses
Fuji worship
Kunitsukami